Andrzej Krzepiński (born 17 July 1963) is a Polish rower. He competed at the 1988 Summer Olympics and the 1992 Summer Olympics.

References

1963 births
Living people
Polish male rowers
Olympic rowers of Poland
Rowers at the 1988 Summer Olympics
Rowers at the 1992 Summer Olympics
Rowers from Warsaw